Simon Greenberg, (1901 – July 26, 1993) was a Russian born American Conservative rabbi and scholar. Greenberg was part of the senior management of many Jewish organizations in America. He helped to found a number of institutions, including the American Jewish University, of which he was the first President. At the time of his death he was vice chancellor emeritus of the Jewish Theological Seminary of America. Greenberg has been called "one of the most important leaders of the Conservative movement".

Life
Greenberg was born in Horoshen, Russia. At the age of 4 he moved to the United States with his family.

In 1922 Greenberg graduated from City College of New York having previously attended the University of Minnesota. He then began studying at the Jewish Theological Seminary of America where he was ordained rabbi in 1925. Throughout his career, Greenberg was committed to both the academic and sacred spheres, often undertaking overlapping tasks. Thus 1925 marked Greenberg's ordination, his enrollment at the Hebrew University of Jerusalem as part of its first class of students and his appointment as rabbi of the Har Zion Temple in Philadelphia, a position he would hold until 1946. His responsibilities in Philadelphia included acting as an advisor to Jewish students at the nearby University of Pennsylvania and Temple University. In his final year in Philadelphia he helped to co-found the Akiba Hebrew Academy.

In 1932, Greenberg was awarded his PhD from Dropsie College. He went on to join the faculty of the Jewish Theological Seminary the same year. In 1950 he became executive director of the United Synagogue of America. The same year at the organization's biennial conference he was instrumental in persuading fellow attendees to call for the repeal of the McCarran Internal Security Act. Greenberg spoke against the Act, calling it a threat to civil liberties. Greenberg stepped down from his role as executive director in 1953.

In 1948, Greenberg was named acting president of Jewish Theological Seminary. In 1957 Greenberg became vice chancellor of the Jewish Theological Seminary, a post he held until 1986. Thereafter he was vice chancellor emeritus. Shortly after becoming vice chancellor, in 1958, Greenberg co-founded the University of Judaism (now the American Jewish University) in Los Angeles. He was the institute's first President, stepping down from the role in 1963, the year he became chairman of the executive committee of the Jewish Agency and the World Zionist Organization of America. He stepped down from that role in 1968.

Personal life
Greenberg and his wife Betty were married for 67 years. They had two sons, Moshe Greenberg, a biblical scholar, and Daniel Greenberg. The couple had moved to Jerusalem from Manhattan approximately a year before Simon's death. His wife pre-deceased him by 4 months.

Legacy
Greenberg has been called "one of the most important leaders of the Conservative movement". Every year the Jewish Theological Seminary present the Rabbi Simon Greenberg Award "for outstanding devotion to klal Yisrael (the entire Jewish community) and to all humanity and for unswerving loyalty to JTS."

Selected publications
"Living as a Jew Today" (Behrman, 1940),
"Foundations of a Faith" (Burning Bush Press, 1967),
"The Ethical in the Jewish and American Heritage" (Jewish Theological Seminary, 1977)
"A Jewish Philosophy and Pattern of Life" (Jewish Theological Seminary, 1981).

He edited "The Ordination of Women as Rabbis," a collection of articles, in 1988.

References

External links
Archives of his life
History of the American Jewish University Founder: Simon Greenberg

1901 births
1993 deaths
Jewish Theological Seminary of America people
American Jewish University faculty
University of Minnesota alumni
Dropsie College alumni
Hebrew University of Jerusalem alumni
University of Pennsylvania people
American Conservative rabbis
20th-century American rabbis